Gladiators: The Ashes 2 (aired in Australia as Gladiators: The Ashes Return) was the second Ashes series for Australian Gladiators and UK Gladiators. This was the final series in the original Australian series.

Contenders

Gladiators

Shows

1Replaced Sarah after she was injured in Pendulum.
2Replaced Hannah after she was injured in Gauntlet.

The Ashes Return: Heat One
Original airdate: 28 September 1996 (Australia), 18 January 1997 (United Kingdom)
Contenders:
Marisa Huettner (Australia) Vs Sarah Damm/Michelle Kimberley (United Kingdom)
Paul Reynolds (Australia) Vs Emmil Watson (United Kingdom)

Eliminator

Female: 4 second head start for Michelle (UK)
Male: 1 second head start for Emmil (UK)
Winners: Marisa Huettner (Australia) & Paul Reynolds (Australia)

1Sarah Damm injured her ankle in Pendulum. Michelle Kimberley took her place played the remainder of the games.
2Although Michelle stayed on the platform for the full 30 seconds, Storm was later disqualified for putting her hand on Michelle's hand and pugil stick.
3Paul originally scored 3 points, but one blue ball worth 2 points was disallowed as Paul touched the pole to collect it.

The Ashes Return: Heat Two
Original airdate: 5 October 1996 (Australia), 25 January 1997 (United Kingdom)
Contenders:
Catherine Arlove (Australia) Vs Hannah Owen/Celia Duffield (United Kingdom)
Paul Stubbs (Australia) Vs Mark Everitt2 (United Kingdom)

Eliminator

Female: 6.5 second head start for Catherine (AUS)
Male: 12 second head start for Mark (UK)
Winners: Catherine Arlove (Australia) & Mark Everitt (United Kingdom)

1Hannah Owen injured her elbow in Gauntlet. Celia Duffield took her place and played the remainder of the games.
2Mark Everitt was invited back to take part after making in through to the semi-finals during International Gladiators 2  the previous year but being forced to pull out due to cold/flu illness.

The Ashes Return: Grand Final
Original airdate: 12 October 1996 (Australia), 1 February 1997 (United Kingdom)
Contenders:
Marisa Huettner (Australia) Vs Catherine Arlove (Australia)
Paul Reynolds (Australia) Vs Mark Everitt (United Kingdom)

Eliminator

Female: No head start
Male: No head start
Winners: Marisa Huettner & Paul Reynolds

1Catherine was disqualified for using her body to block Lightning from getting her tag.
2Marisa and Rio interlocked with their pugil sticks and the game had to be restarted. This was only seen on Australian airings.
3Although Marisa was in the scoring zone when the time was up, she was disqualified for attacking Lightning's head and throat.

Winning Country: Australia

References

Gladiators (franchise)